This is the discography for Canadian rock singer Bruce Cockburn.

Albums

Studio albums

Live albums

Compilations

DVDs

Other releases 
 "Ribbon of Darkness", a track on "A Tribute to Gordon Lightfoot"
 "Strong Hand of Love", a track on the Mark Heard tribute albums Strong Hand of Love (1994) and Orphans of God (1996)
 "Lord of the Starfields" (with Rob Wasserman), "Lovers in a Dangerous Time" (with Rob Wasserman), and "Cry of a Tiny Babe" (with Lou Reed, Rosanne Cash, and Rob Wasserman), all on The Best of the Columbia Records Radio Hour, Volume 1 (1995)
 "Last Night of the World" on the WXPN compilation album, Live at the World Café – Volume 9 (1999)
 "If I Had a Rocket Launcher", a track on the acoustic sessions album "2 Meter Sessies Volume 1" (1991).
"Wise Users", a track on the 1996 album, "Honor: A Benefit for the Honor The Earth Campaign"

Chart singles 

Notes
 1 ^ "Going to the Country" peaked at No. 4 on the RPM Adult Contemporary (A/C) chart in November 1970.  However, at the time, and for the Adult Contemporary chart only, RPM only charted A/C songs that qualified as Canadian Content.  This policy was changed mid-way through the song's chart run, and all A/C records regardless of national origin were eligible for the chart. Under these new criteria, "Going to the Country" peaked at No. 11 in December 1970.
 2 ^ The song "Fascist Architecture" was released to radio under the title "I'm Okay". It peaked at No. 1 on the RPM Adult Contemporary (A/C) chart in March 1981. However, at the time, and for the Adult Contemporary chart only, RPM once again only charted A/C songs that qualified as Canadian Content. This short-lived policy was again abandoned later in 1981.

References 

Discographies of Canadian artists
Rock music discographies